RE/MAX, short for Real Estate Maximums, is an American international real estate company that operates through a franchise system. As of 2015, RE/MAX had more than 100,000 agents in 6,800 offices. RE/MAX operates in about 100 countries.

History

Early history: 1970–1976
RE/MAX was founded in January 1973 by Dave Liniger and Gail Main (who later married Liniger and became Gail Liniger). The company was established with a maximum commission concept, meaning agents would keep nearly all of their commissions and pay their broker a share of the office expenses, rather than paying their broker a share of the commission of each sale, which is common in residential real estate. In 1975, Dennis Curtin purchased the first RE/MAX franchise outside of Colorado, in Kansas City, Missouri. The company grew to 100 franchises in two years. RE/MAX held its first convention in Las Vegas in 1976, which became an annual event.

International expansion and introduction of hot air balloon: 1977–1998
RE/MAX Ltd. Canada was started by Michael E. Hagel, of Vancouver BC, opened its first office outside the United States in Calgary, Alberta, Canada in 1977. In 1978, the red, white and blue hot air balloon became the official logo. By 1981, the company had 30 franchises in Canada. RE/MAX became the top real estate company in Canada in 1987. 

In 1994, the company expanded outside North America with the establishment of RE/MAX Europe. Regional operations expanded in Germany, Italy, Spain and South Africa. RE/MAX expanded to Australia and New Zealand in 1996.

In November 1994, the RE/MAX Satellite Network (RSN) was launched in the US. Programs included training and company news.

In 1998, Liniger attempted the first manned balloon flight around the world in a stratospheric gas balloon. The flight was canceled due to design and weather problems.

Online expansion and IPO: 2006–current
In 2006, RE/MAX began to list all U.S. homes for sale on its website, including homes being sold by competitors. By 2009, the company had franchises in 70 countries. 

In April 2010, the Obama Administration announced the "Home Affordable Foreclosure Alternatives" (HAFA) program. The day the announcement was made, leaders from the U.S. Treasury Department and Bank of America participated in a live, national broadcast detailing the initiative at RE/MAX Headquarters in Denver. By 2011, the company had more than 6,000 franchises.

In 2013, UN Special Rapporteur Richard Falk released a report which alleged that real estate groups, such as RE/MAX, found to promote or sell properties in Israeli settlements may be held liable for complicity in the crime of promoting settlement activity in occupied territory. As of November 2015, RE/MAX Israel was still selling properties in 18 different Israeli settlements in the occupied Palestinian territories.

RE/MAX’s parent company, RE/MAX Holdings Inc, raised $220 million in its initial public offering (IPO) in 2013. A secondary offering was completed of approximately $185 million in November 2015. REMAX Holdings owns 58.3% and RIHI owns 41.7% of RE/MAX LLC. Total diluted share count (public and private) as of December 31, 2015, was 30.2 million shares. 

The company expanded into China in 2014 by opening an office in Beijing. The company had more than 15,000 agents in Europe. As of 2016, RE/MAX operates in about 100 countries and has more than 115 hot air balloons in operation, the largest corporate hot air balloon fleet in the world.

In 2018, former president of the company Geoff Lewis, and Liniger stepped down from their roles to retire. Responsibilities were handed to CEO Adam Contos. In 2018 it was announced that founder David Liniger had violated company ethics with a multi-million-dollar loan of his own personal money to Contos.

Philanthropy
In 1992, RE/MAX became a sponsor of Children's Miracle Network. The company hosts art auctions, organizes golf tournaments, and encourages agent fundraising activities. Collectively, all RE/MAX affiliates have raised $147 million for the Children's Miracle Network hospitals in over 20 years of sponsorship.

In 2002, the company became a sponsor of the Susan G. Komen Breast Cancer Foundation Race For The Cure events in the United States.

Local offices use hot air balloons for educational programs and non-profit organization fundraisers.

Recognition
RE/MAX University has been featured in Training Magazines Top 125 US Organizations recognizing employee development.

References

External links 

 
 Oficial website Italy
 Oficial website Moldavia

Franchises
Real estate companies established in 1973
Real estate services companies of the United States
American companies established in 1973
Companies based in Denver